Gwendoline Etonde Burnley, born Martin (1932-2020) was a Cameroonian politician and development consultant. She was the first woman Cameroonian from West of the Mungo to become a Member of Parliament in the Cameroon National Assembly, and was MP from 1969 to 1988.

Life

Gwendoline Burnley was born in Buea on February 29, 1932, the daughter of Ernest Kofele Martin and Hannah Nene Enanga Martin, née Steane. She attended primary school at the Basel Mission School in Buea, before going to the CMS Girls' School, Lagos. After university she completed a postgraduate diploma in Social Welfare at The Hague. In 1960 she married R. E. G. Burnley. 

Burnley was nominated as the women's representative in the West Cameroon House of Assembly:

After one term in the West Cameroon House, that assembly was dissolved. Burnley returned to the Ministry where she was working until the new National Assembly was formed. Drafted to the new assembly as the only woman in 1969, she spent four terms there and left in 1988, by which time the number of women parliamentarians had risen to 17. In 2012 she criticized the lack of continued progress in increasing female representation in Cameroon's National Assembly.

She died on March 7, 2020.

References

External links
 gwendolineburnley.com

1932 births
2020 deaths
20th-century Cameroonian women politicians
20th-century Cameroonian politicians
Members of the National Assembly (Cameroon)